The Interstate Highway Bridge crosses the Snake River, between Clarkston, Washington and Lewiston, Idaho. The bridge carries U.S. Route 12 (US 12) across the state line between Washington and Idaho. It was built in 1939.

The bridge was the primary route between Lewiston and Clarkston, until the Southway Bridge was constructed in the 1980s.

Gallery

See also
 Lower Granite Lake

References

External links
 Historic image from Asotin County Heritage Collection

Bridges over the Snake River
Road bridges in Idaho
Road bridges in Washington (state)
Transportation in Nez Perce County, Idaho
Transportation in Asotin County, Washington
Bridges of the United States Numbered Highway System
U.S. Route 12
Bridges completed in 1939